Caryocolum leucothoracellum is a moth of the family Gelechiidae. It is found in France, Austria, Switzerland, Italy, Hungary and Morocco.

The length of the forewings is 4–5 mm for males and 4.5–6 mm for females. The forewings are dark brown with a white subcostal streak near the base and a white medial spot. Adults have been recorded on wing from late June to late October, probably in one generation per year.

References

Moths described in 1953
leucothoracellum
Moths of Europe
Moths of Africa